The Cal 24 is an American trailerable sailboat that was designed by C. William Lapworth as a Midget Ocean Racing Club (MORC) racer and first built in 1958.

The boat was the one of the first fiberglass boats produced and the first Cal Yachts brand design produced by Jensen Marine.

The design was originally marketed by the manufacturer as the Cal 24, but is now usually referred to as the Cal 24-1 to differentiate it from the unrelated 1967 Lapworth Cal 2-24 design and the 1983 C. Raymond Hunt Associates-designed Cal 3-24. At the time of their market introduction each of these designs was sold under the designation of Cal 24.

Production
The design was built by Cal Yachts in the United States, from 1958 to 1965 with 184 boats completed, but it is now out of production.

The design was sold as a complete ready-to-sail boat or as a kit for amateur construction.

Design
The Cal 24 is a racing keelboat, built predominantly of fiberglass, with wood trim. It has a fractional sloop rig; a spooned, raked stem; a raised counter, angled transom; a keel-mounted rudder controlled by a tiller and a fixed, stub, modified, long keel with a cutaway forefoot and a retractable centerboard. It displaces  and carries  of ballast.

The boat is normally fitted with a small  outboard motor for docking and maneuvering.

The design has sleeping accommodation for four people, with a double "V"-berth in the bow cabin and two straight settee quarter berths in the main cabin. The galley is located on the port side just aft of the bow cabin. The galley is equipped with a stove and a sink. The head is located under the bow "V"-berth.

Operational history
In a 2010 review Steve Henkel wrote, "best features: The hull is graceful, with springy sheer and relatively low freeboard, which minimizes undesirable windage ... Worst features: The beam of the Cal 24-1 is only 8 feet, making her Space Index the lowest among the comp[etitor]s. Plus, not all kit boats were finished to an acceptable standard of quality."

See also
List of sailing boat types

References

External links

Keelboats
1950s sailboat type designs
Sailing yachts
Trailer sailers
Sailboat type designs by Bill Lapworth
Sailboat types built by Cal Yachts